Jean-Philip Grobler (born 1983), known for his musical project St. Lucia, is a South African singer and musician based in Konstanz, Germany. He is signed to Nettwerk Records and to date has released four albums: When the Night (2013), Matter (2016), Hyperion (2018), and Utopia (2022).

The band is named after the town of the same name in South Africa.

Early life 
Grobler was born in Johannesburg and raised in South Africa. He spent much of his childhood singing in the Drakensberg Boys' Choir which travelled and performed internationally.

Grobler started making music when he was 12 years old. He was inspired by Boyz II Men, Michael Jackson, Sting, and Phil Collins. He soon was experimenting with rock music; however, after 10 years, he got bored with it and got back to the 80s music influences from his childhood. In 2013, when asked about his main musical influences, he noted Phil Collins, Fleetwood Mac (especially Tango in the Night), Radiohead (OK Computer), Mew (And the Glass Handed Kites), and Paul Simon (Graceland). He has also cited Lionel Richie's album Dancing on the Ceiling as an influence.

Career 
At the age of 19 Grobler left South Africa to study music in Liverpool, UK. After studying music at the Liverpool Institute for Performing Arts in England for three years he moved to Brooklyn, NY. There he worked for The Lodge, which helps with music licensing for films and television shows, while continuing to work on his own music. When he was signed to Neon Gold Records in 2012, they re-released his self-titled EP he had previously released independently. Also, during the time, he featured vocals in The Knocks' single "Modern Hearts", which was released in 2013. His debut full-length album, When the Night, was released in October 2013.

Live performances have included fellow musicians Nick Brown, Ross Clark, Dustin Kaufman, Nicky Paul and Patricia Beranek. Grobler has also remixed tracks for such bands as Passion Pit, Foster the People, The colourist and Charli XCX. He produced the debut album by HAERTS. Grobler also opened for Two Door Cinema Club during their 2013 tours. Grobler kicked off his St. Lucia 2014 nationwide tour in Philadelphia on 13 January 2014, and continued to tour across the US and Australia in the months following.

In early December 2014, St. Lucia played a special acoustic set at Renaissance Boston Waterfront Hotel, during which Grobler shared stories about his songs and performed the first live performance of "Call Me Up" and first acoustic rendition of "All Eyes on You."

St. Lucia released the track "Dancing on Glass" in October 2015, and its music video in November 2015. The next single, "Physical", was released in December 2015. These two singles appear on the second studio album, Matter, released on 29 January 2016. A music video was then released for "Help Me Run Away," another song on the album, Matter, in June 2016.  The album cover was designed by Jean-Philip Grobler and Patti Beranek from St. Lucia, along with Silas Adler from Soulland, the Danish men's fashion brand.

In June 2018, St. Lucia released two singles, "A Brighter Love" and "Paradise is Waiting", off their third studio album, Hyperion. The next single, "Walking Away" was released in July 2018. Music videos for "A Brighter Love" and "Walking Away" were released in August 2018. Two more singles, "Bigger" and "Next to You", were released in September. The complete album Hyperion was released 21 September 2018. 

In 2019, St. Lucia released its Acoustic Vol. 1 EP on April 26, 2019.

In April 2022, St. Lucia released the EP Utopia I.

Personal life
Grobler married Patricia (Patti) Beranek in 2012 after the two had dated for 10 years.

They welcomed their first child, Indiana “Indy” Elliot Grobler, on 20 December 2017.

Their second child, Charlie Benjamin Parker, was born on 13 November 2020 at Konstanz, Germany, where Patricia Beranek had grown up.

In February 2021, Grobler and his family moved from New York to Konstanz, Germany, in order to be closer to Beranek's family.

Band members

Jean-Philip Grobler – vocals, guitars
Ross Clark – bass guitars
Nick Paul – keyboards, synthesizers
Dustin Kaufman – drums
Patti Beranek – keyboards, percussion, backing vocals

Discography

Studio albums

Extended plays

Singles

As lead artist

As featured artist

Songwriting and production credits

References

External links 

 

Columbia Records artists
Living people
Musicians from Johannesburg
21st-century South African musicians
Musicians from Brooklyn
1983 births
White South African people